Camila Bordonaba Roldán (born September 4, 1984) is an Argentine actress, singer and theater director. She is known for her performances in the series Chiquititas, Rebelde Way, El Patrón de la Vereda, Atracción x4 en Dream Beach and for having been part of the pop-rock band Erreway along with Felipe Colombo, Benjamín Rojas and Luisana Lopilato.

Biography 
Camila was born on September 4, 1984, in El Palomar, Buenos Aires province. Her father Juan Carlos Bordonaba is a grocer and her mother Nora Roldán is a podiatrist. She has two older siblings, Melina and Rodrigo.

Career 
In 1987 she made her television debut when she was only three years old in the musical program Canta Niño, joining the cast with her older sister, Melina.

She sang in "La banda de Canta Niño" and also sang some songs as a soloist, such as «Señora Vaca» with which she did the casting, «Será como mamá y papá», «Somos el mundo» (Spanish version of We Are the World by Michael Jackson), the original in English, «Estrelinha» in Portuguese and «Pubbli-pubbli-pubblicità» and «La Ciribiricoccola», both in Italian with her sister. At age eight she began studying acting. She previously practiced rhythmic gymnastics and participated in competitions. At twelve she began her career as an actress in the children's telenovela Chiquititas, created and produced by Cris Morena, with Nadia Di Cello being the actresses who lasted the longest in the cast. She participated from 1996 to 2001 in the theatrical seasons of it. In 2001 she filmed her first film called Chiquititas: Rincón de luz starring Romina Yan and Facundo Arana. In 2002 and 2003, she starred alongside Benjamín Rojas, Luisana Lopilato and Felipe Colombo in the Rebelde Way series, a fiction for adolescents created and produced by Cris Morena. At the same time, she joined the musical band named Erreway, along with her co-stars, and published the first album "Señales".  With the success of the series and the band begins the "Señales Tour" presenting the songs of the album throughout Argentina, along with the more than fifteen musical performances of "Rebelde Way, el show", which includes the final concert, carried out at the Gran Rex theater in Buenos Aires. In 2003 Erreway released his second album entitled "Tiempo" and started the "Nuestro Tiempo" tour. She traveled to Israel, giving eighteen concerts at the Nokia Sport Center Stadium in Tel Aviv, along with the cast of the series.

In 2004, she shot her second movie called Erreway: 4 caminos. This is accompanied by the publication of Erreway's latest album entitled "Memoria", which includes all the themes of the film. Presenting the album, Erreway gives his last tour and the group splits to embark on new projects of their own. That same year she participates as a villain in the series Floricienta where she appears in the role of Paloma/Julieta Mónaco. In 2005, she obtained the first adult leading role of her, as Sisí Ponte, along with the actor Gustavo Bermúdez in the telenovela El Patrón de la Vereda. She performed the theme song for it. She also makes a guest appearance on the series ¿Quién es el jefe? as a judge. In 2006, she was part of the cast of Gladiadores de Pompeya broadcast by Canal 9. That year, after the success of the Rebelde Way series in Spain, broadcast since 2004 on several channels, the "Erreway Fever" returns. Two new albums are released, a compilation called "The Rebelde Way album" and a live one, "Erreway In Concert". After the success in sales, the albums "Señales" and "Tiempo" were published in Spain. In July Felipe Colombo and Camila travel to Spain to represent Erreway with various record companies and press conferences. In December they met again, this time without Luisana Lopilato, for the "European Tour", with concerts in several Spanish cities and all tickets sold out. In 2007, in Spain, Luisana Lopilato, was chosen "The beautiful young international actress" (she won among actresses such as Jessica Alba, Scarlett Johansson, Jessica Biel and others). That same year the telecomedy Son de Fierro was released on Channel 13, where she plays the partner of Felipe Colombo in the role of Karina. The series becomes the most successful fiction of the year. With the return of Erreway behind her back, the group begins to record without Luisana, a new album called "Vuelvo", which would only be published in Spain and which included songs from the album "Memoria" recorded again by the trio. That same year the complete Erreway anthology was published in Spain. The new Spanish tour was finally canceled, as was the publication of the album "Vuelvo" that was already recorded. At the end of 2008, the series Atracción x4 was premiered in Dream Beach where, after a long time, she returned to share the script with Luisana Lopilato, playing Malena Lacalle, one of the members of the group "Latinas". This TV show replaced the Patito feo series, ending in 2009. In 2010, she starred in the horror film Penumbra, shot in the city of La Plata and directed by the García Bogliano brothers, where she played Victoria, one of the clients interested in the Marga's department.

In 2012, she published a new song called «Solo me salva amar» with her new band formed with Felipe Colombo and Guillermo Lorenzo, "La Miss Tijuana". After the success of the first song, another song called «Vuelvo» is published in July. Since 2010 she walked away from fame. In 2011, Camila totally devotes herself to her Arcoyrá project, getting on a caravan to tour the country with her art space. This lifestyle, which included sleeping in the fields and cooking on a stove, attracted media attention. She also directed the play Una noche en el castillo.

Personal life 

Bordonaba is the godmother of Erreway bandmate and close friend Felipe Colombo's daughter alongside Benjamín Rojas, whom she dated while filming Chiquititas.

Since 2012, Bordonaba quit being a public figure, living a quiet life in the south of Argentina, but still remains active in the arts, working as a director.

Filmography

Television programs

Television

Theater

Movies

Discography

Soundtrack albums

 1996 — Chiquititas Vol. 2
 1997 — Chiquititas Vol. 3
 1998  — Chiquititas Vol. 4
 1999 —  Chiquititas Vol. 5
 2000 — Chiquititas Vol. 6
 2001 — Chiquititas Vol. 7
 2001 — Chiquititas: Rincón de Luz
 2005 — El Patrón de la Vereda
 2007 — Son de Fierro
 2008 — Atracción x4
 2009 — Atracción x4

Erreway 

 2002 — Señales
 2002 — Erreway en Grand Rex
 2003 — Tiempo
 2003 — Nuestro Tiempo
 2004 — Nuestro Tiempo
 2004 — Memoria
 2004 — Gira 2004
 2006 — El Disco de Rebelde Way
 2006 — Erreway en Concierto
 2007 — Erreway presenta su caja recopilatoria
 2007 — Erreway en España
 2007 — Vuelvo

La Miss Tijuana 
 2010 — Sólo Me Salva Amar
 2010 — Vuelvo
 2011 — Deja que llueva
 2011 —  3 iguanas

Notes

References

External links
 https://www.youtube.com/watch?v=nJqOUWBXoNM (Erreway Camila Bordonaba_song: "No hay que llorar /studio album: Memoria 2004).
 https://www.youtube.com/watch?v=IAIcqO_C41c (Erreway_song: "Tiempo")
 http://www.novebox.com/series/rebelde-way-temporada1/88108 (season 1)
 http://www.novebox.com/series/rebelde-way-temporada2/91392 (season 2)
 http://www.novebox.com/Famosos/camila-bordonaba/88104
 https://web.archive.org/web/20120407035646/http://blogs.ideal.es/unrobin/2008/12/3/entrevista-camila-bordonaba-popstar/
 
 

1984 births
Living people
People from Morón Partido
Actresses from Buenos Aires
Argentine television actresses
Argentine film actresses
Argentine stage actresses
Singers from Buenos Aires
Argentine women singer-songwriters
Argentine female models
Women rock singers
Argentine child actresses
20th-century Argentine actresses
21st-century Argentine actresses
21st-century Argentine women singers